Fukushima F.C. was a Japanese football club based in Koriyama, Fukushima. The club played in the old Japan Football League in the 1990s.

Club name
1951–1981 : Fukushima Teachers SC
1982–1997 : Fukushima FC

External links
Football of Japan

Defunct football clubs in Japan
1951 establishments in Japan
1997 disestablishments in Japan
Sports teams in Fukushima Prefecture
Association football clubs established in 1951
Association football clubs disestablished in 1997